John Lees is a retired sports journalist who holds the record for completing the fastest coast-to-coast walk across the United States. Starting at Los Angeles City Hall on 11 April 1972, he walked for 53 days, 12 hours and 15 minutes to New York City Hall, finishing on 3 June 1972.

Lees became the sports reporter and cricket commentator for various BBC radio stations in the south east of England, including BBC Sussex, BBC Surrey and BBC Southern Counties Radio, where he was often referred to as "the gentleman of sport". He retired from BBC radio in September 2017.

He made a return visit to New York City Hall to mark the 30th anniversary of his amazing feat of endurance. This nostalgic event was covered by BBC Southern Counties Radio.

Lees is a keen birdwatcher.

References

British sports journalists
Living people
Place of birth missing (living people)
English male racewalkers
Year of birth missing (living people)